Stefan Toleski (13 August 1979 – 12 December 2002) was an Macedonian footballer who played professionally for Hungarian side Nagykanizsa in 2000. He was a Macedonia youth international footballer. In December 2002, he suffered a fatal heart attack during a match against KF Milano Kumanovë.

Career statistics

Club

Notes

References

1979 births
2002 deaths
Macedonian footballers
Macedonian expatriate footballers
North Macedonia youth international footballers
Association football midfielders
Nemzeti Bajnokság I players
FK Sileks players
FK Napredok players
Macedonian expatriate sportspeople in Hungary
Expatriate footballers in Hungary
Association football players who died while playing
Accidental deaths in North Macedonia